The Haus der Kunst (House of Art) is a non-collecting modern and contemporary art museum in Munich, Germany. It is located at Prinzregentenstraße 1 at the southern edge of the Englischer Garten, Munich's largest park.

History

Nazi Germany
The building was constructed from 1933 to 1937 following plans of architect Paul Ludwig Troost as Nazi Germany's first monumental structure of Nazi architecture and as Nazi propaganda. The museum, then called Haus der Deutschen Kunst ("House of German Art"), was opened on 18 July 1937 as a showcase for what the Nazi Party regarded as Germany's finest art, with celebrations including a historical pageant and a military parade. The inaugural exhibition was the Große Deutsche Kunstausstellung ("Great German Art Exhibition"), which was intended as an edifying contrast to the condemned modern art on display in the concurrent Degenerate Art Exhibition.

On 15 and 16 July 1939, the Große Deutsche Kunstausstellung inside the Haus der Deutschen Kunst was complemented by the monumental Tag der Deutschen Kunst celebration of "2,000 years of Germanic culture" where luxuriously draped floats (one of them carrying a 5 meter tall golden Nazi Reichsadler) and thousands of actors in historical costumes paraded down Prinzregentenstraße for hours in the presence of Adolf Hitler, Hermann Göring, Joseph Goebbels, Heinrich Himmler, Albert Speer, Robert Ley, Reinhard Heydrich, and many other high-ranking Nazis, with minor events taking place in the Englischer Garten nearby. 

The 1939 Tag der Deutschen Kunst was documented by a group of hobby cinematographers on 16 mm Kodachrome color movie. The resulting 30-minute film is still pristine today due to Kodachrome's unusual archival properties, and is available in a variety of editions on VHS and DVD, such as Farben 1939 - Tag der Deutschen Kunst in München.

Post-war
After the end of World War II, the museum building was first used by the American occupation forces as an officers' mess; in that time, the building came to be known as the "P1", a shortening of its street address. The building's original purpose can still be seen in such guises as the swastika-motif mosaics in the ceiling panels of its front portico.

Beginning in 1946, the museum rooms, now partitioned into several smaller exhibition areas, started to be used as temporary exhibition space for trade shows and visiting art exhibitions. Some parts of the museum were also used to showcase works from those of Munich's art galleries that had been destroyed during the war. The original steps at the building's entrance were removed to make way for a road tunnel, which opened in 1972. 

In 2002, the National Collection of Modern and Contemporary Arts moved into the Pinakothek der Moderne. Today, while housing no permanent art exhibition of its own, the museum is still used as a showcase venue for temporary exhibitions and traveling exhibitions, including on Tutankhamun, Zeit der Staufer, Gilbert and George (2007), Andreas Gursky (2007), Anish Kapoor (2007), Ai Weiwei (2009), Ellsworth Kelly (2011), Georg Baselitz (2014), Louise Bourgeois (2015), and Frank Bowling (2017). A 2012 joint venture with the Museum of Contemporary Art, Los Angeles, Ends of the Earth: Land Art to 1974 was the first major museum survey of land art worldwide. The museum also drew acclaim for Postwar: Art Between the Pacific and the Atlantic, 1945-1965 in 2016, an effort to tell a global narrative of art in the two decades after World War II. A 2019 retrospective of the Ghanaian sculptor El Anatsui became the museum’s best-attended show in 10 years. 

In 2013, London-based architect David Chipperfield was commissioned to submit plans for refurbishing Haus der Kunst; the plans were eventually presented to the public in 2016. For approximately 60 million euros, the planned renovation aims to create space for cinema, performance and musical events. Chipperfield also proposed to open up blocked skylights to allow daylight into the building.

After artistic director Okwui Enwezor’s departure for health reasons in 2018, Haus der Kunst appointed an expert commission to oversee programming and strategy between 2019 and 2020. The commission was led by Bice Curiger and also included Achim Hochdörfer of the Museum Brandhorst and the collector Ingvild Goetz. In 2019, a selection committee selected Andrea Lissoni as new artistic director; the committee was chaired by Nina Zimmer and included Daniel Birnbaum, Doryun Chong, Susanne Gaensheimer, and Nicholas Serota.

Collection
Despite being a non-collecting institution, Haus der Kunst has over the years received numerous works of art. 

In 2011, Haus der Kunst forged a partnership with the private Goetz Collection to co-curate exhibits of video art. By 2013, it was one of the beneficiaries – along with the Bavarian State Museums and the Neues Museum in Nuremberg – when Ingvild Goetz donated her collection of video art to the state of Bavaria and made the collection as a whole, which includes almost 5,000 works, available on permanent loan.

In 2017, Jewish artist Mel Bochner donated his piece Joys of Yiddish (2012-15) to Haus der Kunst. Comprising a list of Yiddish words in yellow on black, it traverses the museum's façade as a reminder of the tragic disappearance of the language from German culture.

Management

Directors
 1993–2003: Christoph Vitali
 2003–2011: Chris Dercon
 2011–2018: Okwui Enwezor 
 From 2020: Andrea Lissoni

Funding
The State of Bavaria is the biggest shareholder of Haus der Kunst, and provides the museum with millions of euros every year. Since 1983, the museum building also houses the nightclub P1, Munich's famous high-society destination; the rent is one of the museum's revenue streams.

In 2011, Dercon left Haus der Kunst with capital of €1.5 million. During his time in office, Enwezor oversaw the initial fundraising for the planned €150 million renovation of Haus der Kunst. In 2018, however, Haus der Kunst cancelled an exhibition of video and performance artist Joan Jonas, citing “a difficult financial situation stemming from management errors of the past.” It also had to postpone a Theaster Gates show until 2019.

Controversy 
In March 2017, a controversy received international media attention when the director of the Haus der Kunst, Okwui Enwezor, fired a member of the Church of Scientology based on the man's religious affiliation. In Bavaria, employees are required to sign that they are not Scientologists in order to obtain employment if the institution receives financial support from the Bavarian government.

References

External links

Opening ceremony with Adolf Hitler, Heinrich Himmler, the SS and Wehrmacht, a color film (YouTube, CHRONOS-MEDIA History channel)
GDK Research, research platform for images of the Great German Art Exhibitions 1937-1944 in Munich
 Complete catalogs of all the Great German Art Exhibitions 1937-1944
Virtual reconstruction of the Haus der Deutschen Kunst 
Haus der Deutschen Kunst
Museum's website
P1 nightclub website
Interview with the curator form the Museum, by amadelio, 2006

Art museums and galleries in Munich
Nazi architecture
Art museums established in 1937
1937 establishments in Germany